Frans Bouwmeester (born 19 May 1940 in Breda) is a retired Dutch footballer who was active as a left winger and was later chief scout at Feyenoord.

Club career
Bouwmeester started his career in his town of birth, Breda where he played for NAC. After three seasons at this team he made a switch towards Feijenoord. This turned out to be the most successful period in his career. In both 1961 and 1962 Feijenoord took the Eredivisie Championship. In 1965 Bouwmeester and Feijenoord won both the league and the KNVB Cup.

International career
From 1959 to 1968 Bouwmeester was also called up to represent the Netherlands national football team. He made his debut in a 7-0 loss versus West Germany on 21 October 1959. In total he would play in five international matches, the final one an October 1968 FIFA World Cup qualification match against Bulgaria.

Scouting career
After his career Bouwmeester became a scout at Willem II Tilburg from 1992 to 1994. After that he became head scout at Feyenoord. He was a scout for hometown club NAC from 2005 to 2014.

Personal life
Bouwmeester suffered from a stroke after he had a kidney transplant in 2014, receiving a kidney from his daughter.

References

External links
 
 
 

1940 births
Living people
Footballers from Breda
Association football wingers
Dutch footballers
Netherlands international footballers
NAC Breda players
Feyenoord players
R.W.D. Molenbeek players
FC Dordrecht players
Footballers from Rotterdam
Eredivisie players
Dutch expatriate footballers
Expatriate footballers in Belgium
Dutch expatriate sportspeople in Belgium
Feyenoord non-playing staff